Martin Kuncl (born 1 April 1984 in Brno) is a Czech footballer who played for most of his career in 1. FC Slovácko. He currently plays in lower tiers.

References

External links

1984 births
Living people
Czech footballers
Czech Republic under-21 international footballers
Czech First League players
FC Zbrojovka Brno players
AC Sparta Prague players
1. FC Slovácko players

Association football defenders
Footballers from Brno